A gender crime is a hate crime committed against a specific gender. Specific gender crimes may include some instances of rape, genital mutilation, forced prostitution, and forced pregnancy. 
Often gender crimes are committed during armed conflict or during times of political upheaval or instability. According to one news story on CNN, people usually commit hate crimes as a form of thrill seeking, retaliation, defensiveness or because they feel they need to complete a mission. Some examples of these conflicts include the Yugoslavian Civil War and the Rwandan genocide.

Gender crime is not universally recognized as a category of hate crime but is increasingly being included in the United States as a category in state and federal hate crime laws. 
Internationally most gender crimes committed during times of war are recognized as war crimes as set forth by the Fourth Geneva Convention.
Revenge porn and other online behavior are seen as a hate crime. Feminist criminologists have also pioneered the specific discipline of criminal victimization which could be considered one of many major factors contributing to gender crimes. For example, there is a greater likelihood of women in comparison to men who are victims of a familiar person, in most cases a man that they know, instead of a stranger.

See also 
Femicide
Sexism
Prosecution of gender-targeted crimes
Rape during the Rwandan Genocide
Feminazi

Further reading

References

External links
"Hate Crime." Oxford Bibliographies Online: Criminology. 

Hate crime
Gender and crime